Kelly Jarrod Jennings (born November 30, 1982) is a former American football cornerback. He was drafted by the Seattle Seahawks in the first round of the 2006 NFL Draft. He played college football at the University of Miami.

Early years
Jennings graduated from Suwannee High School in Live Oak, Florida. During his Senior Year he placed 4th at the 2A State Track Meet in the 100 meters, with a time of 10.76 seconds, current NFL Player Yamon Figurs was 2nd, with a time of 10.56 seconds.

College career

Jennings played college football at the University of Miami, where he graduated with a degree in finance and a 3.0 grade point average.  He currently is in the process of acquiring a second degree in business management.

Professional career

Seattle Seahawks
Jennings was drafted by the Seahawks out of the University of Miami with the 31st overall pick in the first round of the 2006 NFL Draft.  Kelly has played for the Seahawks on special teams and defense.

Jennings' selection in the 2006 first round kept alive an ongoing record by the University of Miami, which has had players selected as first-round draft picks in each of the past 12 NFL drafts and the following 2 drafts after Jennings selection.  No other college or university has ever matched this record.

In his rookie season, Jennings served as a nickelback and special teamer primarily until Marcus Trufant, Kelly Herndon, and Jimmy Williams all sustained injuries in week 16 and 17 of the 2006 NFL season. He ended up playing in 16 games, starting in 2, recording 40 tackles, 1 interception, 6 passes defended, 1 forced fumble, and giving up 2 touchdowns. In the postseason, with Seattle's secondary seriously hurting and forced to start safety Jordan Babineaux at #2 CB and previously out of the NFL Pete Hunter at nickel, Jennings was forced into the #1 role for the Wild Card game against the Dallas Cowboys and was primarily used to cover Terry Glenn due to their similar body build and playing styles. Glenn was held to 4 receptions for 41 yards, while Jennings recorded 1 tackle and a game-saving forced fumble on Glenn that would lead to a Seattle safety which would later prove vital in a 21-20 Seahawks victory. In the Divisional Playoff game against the Chicago Bears, Jennings recorded 6 tackles but was beat deep on a 68-yard touchdown pass from Rex Grossman to Bernard Berrian. The Bears ended up winning in overtime 27-24. Kelly Jennings had a great 2007 season as he finished with 55 tackles and 12 pass deflections. Coming into the 2008 season, Kelly had high expectations, but was moved to the nickelback and performed well once again at a position he has proven to be more than capable at. He finished the 2008 season with 42 tackles and 12 pass deflections.

In 2009, he compiled 30 tackles and 5 passes defended.

Cincinnati Bengals
On August 29, 2011, he was traded to the Cincinnati Bengals for defensive tackle Clinton McDonald.

NFL statistics

Personal
Kelly is the uncle of CFL cornerback Bruce Johnson. Kelly is married to his wife Fritzie Jennings and has six children. He now lives in Durham, North Carolina

References

External links
Seattle Seahawks bio

Living people
1982 births
People from Live Oak, Florida
Players of American football from Florida
American football cornerbacks
Miami Hurricanes football players
Seattle Seahawks players
Cincinnati Bengals players